Impending Ascension is the second studio album by the progressive metal/rock band Magellan.

Track listing
All music and lyrics by Trent Gardner.
"Estadium Nacional" - 11:16 
"Waterfront Weirdos" - 11:05
"Songsmith" - 5:33          
"Virtual Reality" - 5:28    
"No Time for Words" - 2:09  
"Storms and Mutiny" - 11:50 
"Under the Wire" - 1:42

Personnel 
Musicians:
 Trent Gardner - lead vocals, keyboards, backing vocals
 Wayne Gardner - electric and acoustic guitars, vocals
 Hal Stringfellow Imbrie - bass, vocals
 Doane Perry – drums on "Waterfront Weirdos" at Narnia Oaks Studio, Woodland Hills, Ca. All other drum tracks by Magellan.
 Hope Harris – female voice on "Virtual Reality"

Production:
 David Houston – engineer
 Shawn Lux – cover paintings and  coat of arms c/o Lux Metals, Santa Rosa, Ca.
 Mike Martin – engineer
 Kenneth Lee Jr. – mastering at Rocket-Lab, San Francisco April 1993
 Trent Gardner – cover concept
 Wayne Gardner – Magellan portrait and "The Overseer & His Witnesses" painting

References

External links
Encyclopaedia Metallum page

Magellan (band) albums
1994 albums